In mathematics, when the elements of some set  have a notion of equivalence (formalized as an equivalence relation), then one may naturally split the set  into equivalence classes. These equivalence classes are constructed so that elements  and  belong to the same equivalence class if, and only if, they are equivalent.

When the set  has some structure (such as a group operation or a topology) and the equivalence relation  is compatible with this structure, the quotient set often inherits a similar structure from its parent set. Examples include quotient spaces in linear algebra, quotient spaces in topology, quotient groups, homogeneous spaces, quotient rings, quotient monoids, and quotient categories.

Examples
 Let  be the set of all rectangles in a plane, and  the equivalence relation "has the same area as", then for each positive real number  there will be an equivalence class of all the rectangles that have area 
 Consider the modulo 2 equivalence relation on the set of integers,  such that  if and only if their difference  is an even number. This relation gives rise to exactly two equivalence classes: one class consists of all even numbers, and the other class consists of all odd numbers. Using square brackets around one member of the class to denote an equivalence class under this relation,  and  all represent the same element of 
 Let  be the set of ordered pairs of integers  with non-zero  and define an equivalence relation  on  such that  if and only if  then the equivalence class of the pair  can be identified with the rational number  and this equivalence relation and its equivalence classes can be used to give a formal definition of the set of rational numbers. The same construction can be generalized to the field of fractions of any integral domain.
In this situation, each equivalence class determines a point at infinity.

Definition and notation

An equivalence relation on a set  is a binary relation  on  satisfying the three properties:
  for all  (reflexivity),
  implies  for all  (symmetry),
 if  and  then  for all  (transitivity).

For example, "being isomorphic" is an equivalence relation on groups, and the equivalence classes, called isomorphism classes, are not sets.

Every element of an equivalence class characterizes the class, and may be used to represent it. When such an element is chosen, it is called a representative of the class. Since its composition with the canonical surjection is the identity of  such an injection is called a section, when using the terminology of category theory. 

Sometimes, there is a section that is more "natural" than the other ones. In this case, the representatives are called .

The use of representatives for representing classes allows avoiding to consider explicitly classes as sets. In this case, the canonical surjection that maps an element to its class is replaced by the function that maps an element to the representative of its class.

Properties

Therefore, the set of all equivalence classes of  forms a partition of : every element of  belongs to one and only one equivalence class. Conversely, every partition of  comes from an equivalence relation in this way, according to which  if and only if  and  belong to the same set of the partition.

It follows from the properties of an equivalence relation that
 if and only if 

Graphical representation

Invariants

Some authors use "compatible with " or just "respects " instead of "invariant under ".

More generally, a function may map equivalent arguments (under an equivalence relation  on ) to equivalent values (under an equivalence relation  on ). Such a function is a morphism of sets equipped with an equivalence relation.

Quotient space in topology

In topology, a quotient space is a topological space formed on the set of equivalence classes of an equivalence relation on a topological space, using the original space's topology to create the topology on the set of equivalence classes.

In abstract algebra, congruence relations on the underlying set of an algebra allow the algebra to induce an algebra on the equivalence classes of the relation, called a quotient algebra. In linear algebra, a quotient space is a vector space formed by taking a quotient group, where the quotient homomorphism is a linear map. By extension, in abstract algebra, the term quotient space may be used for quotient modules, quotient rings, quotient groups, or any quotient algebra. However, the use of the term for the more general cases can as often be by analogy with the orbits of a group action.

The orbits of a group action on a set may be called the quotient space of the action on the set, particularly when the orbits of the group action are the right cosets of a subgroup of a group, which arise from the action of the subgroup on the group by left translations, or respectively the left cosets as orbits under right translation.

A normal subgroup of a topological group, acting on the group by translation action, is a quotient space in the senses of topology, abstract algebra, and group actions simultaneously.

Both the sense of a structure preserved by an equivalence relation, and the study of invariants under group actions, lead to the definition of invariants of equivalence relations given above.

See also

 Equivalence partitioning, a method for devising test sets in software testing based on dividing the possible program inputs into equivalence classes according to the behavior of the program on those inputs
 Homogeneous space, the quotient space of Lie groups

Notes

References

Further reading

External links

Algebra
Binary relations
Equivalence (mathematics)
Set theory